AVM Saeedullah Khan (23 July 1926 – 2002) was one of the pioneering officers of Pakistan Air Force.  He joined the newly formed air force, then known as Royal Pakistan Air Force, as a flying officer (pilot) and rose to the rank of Air Vice Marshal. He served as Deputy Chief of Air Staff (DCAS) between 22 June 1972 to 29 June 1973.

Family
Khan was born to S.A. Khan, an Indian Civil Service (ICS) officer.
http://www.bharat-rakshak.com/IAF/images/officers/03241.jpg

Career

Royal Indian Air Force (RIAF)
He was commissioned as a pilot in the Royal Indian Air Force (RIAF) on 17 September 1945 and his service number was 3241. Between 14 November 1946 and 22 July 1947 he was posted at Kolar.

Pakistan Air Force
After the independence of Pakistan in 1947, he decided to join Pakistan. In 1951, he flew his Hawker Sea Fury as part of the first aerobatic team, the Red Dragons, in the Indian Subcontinent, which was involved in the farewell ceremonies of the Commander-in-Chief, AVM R. L. R. Atcherely in Peshawar.

Commands
 No 9 Squadron: September 1953 to September 1954
 No 2 Squadron: 19 July 1956 to 10 April 1957
 No 32 F.G.A. Wing: 5 May 1958 to 24 October 1958
 No 33 Air Supply Wing: May 1961 to January 1962

References

External links
 Profile of Saeedullah Khan on Bharat rakshak.

1926 births
2002 deaths
Pakistan Air Force officers
Muhajir people
Pakistani aviators